Kothay Amar Neel Doriya is the first and only album of Bangladeshi singer and Swadhin Bangla Betar Kendra artiste Mohammed Abdul Jabbar. The album contains nine basic songs, which are written by lyricist Md Amirul Islam and composed by Md Golam Sarwar.

Background 
The musical work of the album began in 2008. A patriotic song termed Ekhane Amar Padma Meghna written by lyricist Md Amirul Islam, was recorded in the voice of singer Abdul Jabbar to air on Bangladesh Television. Being fascinated by the song, artiste Abdul Jabbar expressed his desire to make an album to lyricist Amirul Islam. As per the artiste's direction, lyricist Amirul Islam wrote the rest of the songs for album and music director Md Golam Sarwar composed them. The album was released online in 2017 due to various complications although it was finished in 2009. Since recording almost all the songs of the album, specially the song Ekhane Amar Padma Meghna, are broadcast on various private TV channels including Bangladesh Television.

Naming 
The album was initially titled Maa Amar Masjid Maa Amar Mandir. Later, the album was named Kothay Amar Neel Doriya after Abdul Jabbar's most popular song Ore Neel Doriya Amay De Re De Chhariya.

Notable songs

References 

2017 albums
Abdul Jabbar (singer) albums
Bengali-language albums